Maria Sílvia Correa Moreira Menezes Aguiar (February 16, 1944 – July 26, 2009) was a Brazilian film, stage and television actress.

Sílvia was already a well established film and theater actress by the time she made her television acting debut in the late 1970s. Her role in a telenovela came in 1977 on O Astro (Star) on Rede Globo. One of her most well known telenovela roles was on the Rede Globo show, Alma gêmea (Soulmate), in 2005 in which she played a traditional, elderly Brazilian indigenous woman. Silvia's other telenovela credits included Torre de Babel in 1998, Chocolate com pimenta in 2003, and Páginas da Vida in 2006.

Sílvia appeared in a number of films throughout her career, some of which were directed by Walter Lima Jr, Ruy Guerra, Arnaldo Jabor and Paulo César Saraceni.

Maria Sílvia died of lung cancer on July 26, 2009, in Rio de Janeiro at the age of 65. She was buried on July 27 at the Cemitério São João Batista in Botafogo, neighborhood in the southern zone of Rio de Janeiro.

Filmography

Telenovelas
 1977 - O Astro - Tânia
 1988 - Olho por Olho - Maria
 1989 - Kananga do Japão - Brígida
 1990 - A História de Ana Raio e Zé Trovão - Fifi
 1993 - Você Decide - Marilu
 1994 - Memorial de Maria Moura - Jove
 1998 - Torre de Babel - Dirce
 2000 - Brava Gente - Ivone
 2003 - Chocolate com Pimenta - Vizinha
 2005 - Alma Gêmea - Índia Velha
 2006 - Páginas da Vida - Marlene
 2006 - Vidas Opostas - Mercedes
 2007 - Caminhos do Coração - Magda
 2008 - Chamas da Vida - Miriam
 2009 - Os Mutantes - Caminhos do Coração - Magda

Films
1975 - Joanna Francesa
1976 - Gordos e Magros
1976 - Marília e Marina
1976 - A Queda
1976 - Assuntina das Amérikas
1976 - Perdida
1977 - Ajuricaba, o Rebelde da Amazônia
1977 - Esse Rio Muito Louco
1977 - Anchieta, José do Brasil
1977 - Mar de Rosas
1978 - O Bandido Antonio Do
1978 - Tudo Bem
1979 - Amor e Traição
1980 - Cabaret Mineiro
1981 - Eu Te Amo
1982 - Luz del Fuego
1983 - Janete
1983 - O Mágico e o Delegado
1984 - Patriamada
1984 - Noites do Sertão
1984 - Dois Homens Para Matar
1984 - Águia na Cabeça
1986 - Ópera do Malandro
1987 - Ele, o Boto
1988 - Romance
1989 - Minas-Texas
1995 - Sombras de Julho
1995 - Yemanján tyttäret
1996 - Como Nascem os Anjos
1998 - Amor & Cia
2001 - Uma Vida em Segredo
2004 - O Diabo a Quatro
2005 - Desejo

References

External links

1944 births
2009 deaths
Brazilian stage actresses
Brazilian television actresses
Brazilian film actresses
Actresses from São Paulo
Deaths from cancer in Rio de Janeiro (state)
Deaths from lung cancer